Daniel Alexander Pedersen (born 27 July 1992) is a Danish professional footballer who currently plays for Orange County SC in the USL Championship.

Career
Pedersen signed his first full-time contract with Silkeborg IF just before he turned 19.

Before Pedersen even had his debut, he was elected for the Danish U20 national football team and played four games before he was put on the Danish U21 national football team. Pedersen debuted for Silkeborg IF August 21, 2011, in a game against HB Køge. The week later, he was chosen to start away against the defending champions, FC Copenhagen.

During his first season, Pedersen showed how he is able to play many positions, also on the midfield. He scored his first goal against FC Midtjylland in a 2–2 draw; his goal was later nominated to goal of the year in the Danish Superliga.

On 7 August 2018, it was confirmed that Pedersen had signed a contract with the Norwegian club Lillestrøm SK.

Pederson joined USL Championship club Orange County SC on 3 February 2022.

Career statistics

Club

References

External links
 Daniel A. Pedersen on AGF
 

1992 births
Living people
Danish men's footballers
Denmark under-21 international footballers
Denmark youth international footballers
Danish expatriate men's footballers
Silkeborg IF players
Aarhus Gymnastikforening players
Lillestrøm SK players
SK Brann players
Orange County SC players
Danish Superliga players
Eliteserien players
Expatriate footballers in Norway
Association football defenders
People from Silkeborg
Danish expatriate sportspeople in Norway
Danish expatriate sportspeople in the United States
Expatriate soccer players in the United States
Sportspeople from the Central Denmark Region